Velamen is a genus of ctenophores belonging to the family Cestidae. It contains a single species, Velamen parallelum. The species is less than 20 cm long on average.

References

Cestidae
Animals described in 1869